The abbreviation viz. (or viz without a full stop) is short for the Latin , which itself is a contraction of the Latin phrase videre licet, meaning "it is permitted to see". It is used as a synonym for "namely", "that is to say", "to wit", "which is", or "as follows". It is typically used to introduce examples or further details to illustrate a point. For example: "all types of data viz. text, audio, video, pictures, graphics, can be transmitted through networking".

Etymology
Viz. is shorthand for the adverb . It uses Tironian notes, a system of Latin shorthand. It comprises the first two letters, "vi", followed by the last two, "et", using the z-shaped Tironian "et", historically written ⁊, a common contraction for "et" in Latin shorthand in Ancient Rome and medieval Europe.

Usage
In contradistinction to i.e. and e.g., viz. is used to indicate a detailed description of something stated before, and when it precedes a list of group members, it implies (near) completeness.

 Viz. is usually read aloud as "that is", "namely", or "to wit", but is sometimes pronounced as it is spelled, viz.: .

Examples
 The main point of his speech, viz. that our attitude was in fact harmful, was not understood.
 "My grandfather had four sons who grew up, viz.: Thomas, John, Benjamin and Josiah."
 The noble gases, viz. helium, neon, argon, xenon, krypton, and radon, show an unexpected behaviour when exposed to this new element.

Compared with scilicet 

Sc. provides a parenthetic clarification, removes an ambiguity, or supplies a word omitted in preceding text, while viz. is usually used to elaborate or detail text which precedes it.

In legal usage, Scilicet appears abbreviated as ss. It can also appear as a section sign (§) in a caption, where it is used to provide a statement of venue, that is to say a location where an action is to take place.

See also
 Cf.
 See also (disambiguation)
 Sic
 Vis-à-vis

Notes

References 

Abbreviations
Latin words and phrases